Acts 16 is the sixteenth chapter of the Acts of the Apostles in the New Testament of the Christian Bible. It records the second missionary journey of Paul, together with Silas and Timothy. The book containing this chapter is anonymous but early Christian tradition uniformly affirmed that Luke composed this book as well as the Gospel of Luke.

Text
The original text was written in Koine Greek and is divided into 40 verses.

Textual witnesses
Some early manuscripts containing the text of this chapter are:
In Greek
 Codex Vaticanus (AD 325–350)
 Codex Sinaiticus (330–360)
 Codex Bezae (c. 400)
 Codex Alexandrinus (c. 400–440)
 Codex Ephraemi Rescriptus (c. 450; extant verses 1–36)
 Papyrus 127 (5th century; extant verses 1–4, 13–40)
 Codex Laudianus (c. 550)
In Latin
 Codex Laudianus (~550; complete)
León palimpsest (7th century; complete)

Locations

This chapter mentions the following places (in order of appearance):
 Derbe
 Lystra
 Iconium
 Phrygia
 Galatia 
 Asia (Roman province)
 Mysia
 Bithynia
 Troas
 Macedonia
 Samothrace
 Neapolis
 Philippi
 Thyatira

Timeline 
The second missionary journey of Paul took place in c. AD 49.

Timothy joins the group (16:1–5)
One of Paul's most trusted and well-known co-workers (Romans 16:21), Timothy is mentioned in epistles to the churches in Rome and Corinth, to the Hebrews and cited as co-author of the letters to Philippi, Thessalonica (2 epistles), Philemon, and Colossae. In verse 4, the apostolic decree (Greek plural: dogmata, commonly used for a 'formal decision by a civic assembly') from the Council of Jerusalem is mentioned for the last time as considered relevant to the churches in this area, even though not addressed directly at the council.

Verse 1
Then he came to Derbe and Lystra. And behold, a certain disciple was there, named Timothy, the son of a certain Jewish woman who believed, but his father was Greek.
"Timothy" or "Timotheus" is the son of Eunice, a Jewish woman whose name is mentioned in 2 Timothy 1:5.

Journey from Phrygia to Troas (16:6–8)
This section records the journey out of Paul's previous mission area ('region of Phrygia and Galatia' in verse 6) in the center and southern part of Anatolia, approaching the north-west corner of Asia Minor following ancient routes (the Roman roads north of Antioch in Pisidia were built in later period), one of which reached north of Antioch, leading 'westwards down the Lycus Valley towards Ephesus'. The direction of the travel was determined by Holy Spirit (verse 6; interchangeable with "the Spirit of Jesus" in verse 7) at least in two junctions: not to take the one that could lead westward to Smyrna, nor the other that could lead northward to Bithynia and Pontus, but following the road towards Troas. The lack of preaching account along this part of the journey indicates that they were continually waiting for guidance, which finally came to Paul when they arrived in the port city of Troas, in a vision of a call for help from the man of Macedonia.

The man of Macedonia (16:9–10)

Verse 9 records a vision in which the Paul is said to have seen a 'man of Macedonia' pleading with him to "come over to Macedonia and help" them. Although it came at night, Paul is said to have a "vision", not a dream (in New Testament, dreams were only linked to Joseph and Pontius Pilate's wife). The passage reports that Paul and his companions responded immediately to the invitation. It is considered to echo  in which the men of Gibeon sent to Joshua saying " ...  come up to us quickly, save us and help us". The first seal of Massachusetts Bay Colony had an American Indian with a scroll coming out over his mouth with the words "Come over and help us", also said to echo the words of the man of Macedonia.

Verse 9 
And a vision appeared to Paul in the night. A man of Macedonia stood and pleaded with him, saying, "Come over to Macedonia and help us."
 "Macedonia": probably the same region as later applied to the Roman province, which included the ancient Macedonia, Illyricum, Epirus, and Thessaly. This was the door for Paul to bring the faith of Christ from Asia to Europe, and the cry, "Come over and help us," could be considered by Paul as a call from the whole western world.

Journey from Troas to Philippi (16:11-15)

The details of sea travel include the specific jargon of seafaring ('set sail', 'took a straight course', verse 11) and every port of call (Samothrace, Neapolis). From Neapolis, the journey is by land along Via Egnatia, the Roman road connecting the northern Aegean cities (Philippi, as well as Amphipolis, Apollonia, and Thessalonica in ) to the ports at Adriatic Sea.

Verse 12
and from there to Philippi, which is the foremost city of that part of Macedonia, a colony. And we were staying in that city for some days.
Philippi was a Roman colony, originally settled by Roman army veterans with Roman magistrates and laws.

Verse 13
And on the Sabbath day we went outside the gate to the riverside, where we supposed there was a place of prayer, and we sat down and spoke to the women who had come together.
Evidence from first-century writings indicates that Jewish communities usually meet 'close to running water' (cf. Josephus. Ant. 14:258).

Verse 14
And a certain woman named Lydia, a seller of purple, of the city of Thyatira, which worshipped God, heard us: whose heart the Lord opened, that she attended unto the things which were spoken of Paul.
The independent status of Lydia as a trader and householder (verse 15) was not unusual for women among the 'traveling merchants and artisans' in most Greek cities of the ancient world and such women often became 'patron and benefactor to Jewish and other immigrant communities'.

The woman of Philippi and the spirit of divination (16:16–24)

Verses 16 to 18
Now it happened, as we went to prayer, that a certain slave girl possessed with a spirit of divination met us, who brought her masters much profit by fortune-telling. This girl followed Paul and us, and cried out, saying, "These men are the servants of the Most High God, who proclaim to us the way of salvation." And this she did for many days. But Paul, greatly annoyed, turned and said to the spirit, "I command you in the name of Jesus Christ to come out of her." And he came out that very hour.
The passage refers of woman who was possessed by a "spirit of divination", whose nature remains unclear. Paul ordered to the spirit to come out of her and this happened in the Name of Jesus Christ, like apostles were called to do against demons. Nevertheless, the spirit of divination affirmed for some days that Paul and Silas were servants of the Most High God.

The saving of the jailer in Philippi (16:15—34)
The dramatic scenes of Pauls's imprisonment and escape in Philippi mirrors Peter's experience in Jerusalem (Acts 12:6—17). The singing hymn in prison is similar to the act of the philosopher Socrates (Epict. Diss. 2.6.26—7) and  the rescue by divine intervention because of faithfulness to God is like that of the prophet Daniel and his friends (cf. Daniel 3, Daniel 6). Instead of escaping during earthquake, Paul honorably stayed inside (by implication also keeping the other prisoners in place) so he could prevent the jailer to commit a shame-induced suicide (verse 28) and brought change in this person's life: treating his prisoners with honor (verse 30; disregarding his original orders in verse 23), washing their wounds (verse 33) and inquiring them about salvation (verse 30). Paul's 'shameful experience of prison' was turned into a successful mission (verse 32), even in the middle of the night (verses 25, 33), that the jailer 'with his entire household' became a 'paradigmatic convert' (stressed three times in verses 32, 33, 34), baptized, 'sharing table-fellowship', and 'rejoicing' (verses 33, 34).

Verse 31
 So they said, “Believe on the Lord Jesus Christ, and you will be saved, you and your household.”

The shaming of the magistrates (16:35-40)
When the 'police' (Greek: rhabdouchoi, "lictors", verse 35) came to order the jailer to release him, Paul chose this time to reveal his Roman citizenship (cf.), which higher standards of legal treatment than other people in the empire should prevent him and his companion to be publicly humiliated, and the violation of this could result in severe punishment for the magistrates (verse 37). A complete the role-reversal then happened with the magistrates came to 'apologize' to Paul (better translation: "implore", from Greek: parekalesan, verse 39) vindicating Paul's faithfulness to God who can turn around potentially humiliating situations into honor.

See also
 Lydia of Thyatira
 Paul the Apostle
 Silas
 Timothy
 Related Bible parts: Acts 14, Acts 15, 2 Timothy 1, 2 Timothy 3

References

Sources

External links
 King James Bible - Wikisource
English Translation with Parallel Latin Vulgate
Online Bible at GospelHall.org (ESV, KJV, Darby, American Standard Version, Bible in Basic English)
Multiple bible versions at Bible Gateway (NKJV, NIV, NRSV etc.)

16